Oscar Morelli, born Oscar Bonfiglio Mouet (February 4, 1936 in Guaymas, Sonora – June 6, 2005 in Mexico City, Distrito Federal), was a Mexican actor.

The son of Oscar Bonfiglio (military and goalkeeper of the national football team of Mexico) and Mercedes Mouet,  Oscar Morelli studied in the Military School of Mexico and acting with Andrés Soler and Seki Sano.  He married actress María Eugenia Rios on June 2, 1958, with whom he had four children:  Oscar (actor), Andrés (actor, singer), Gustavo and María Eugenia. Morelli debuted as an actor in the 1960s working in radio, theater, television and film. He also was director and sports writer. In 1983, Morelli starred in the Puerto Rican canal 4's production, Poquita Cosa, a telenovela in which he shared credits with co-protagonist Angela Meyer, with Junior Alvarez, Yolandita Monge, Myrna de Casenave, Amneris Morales and Pedro Orlando Torres, among other Puerto Rican show-business legends. Participation in this soap opera gave Morelli fame in Puerto Rico.

Death
Oscar Morelli died on June 6, 2005, due to pulmonary problems in the Santelena Hospital in Mexico City, at the age of 69. He wasn't able to complete his last role as an actor in the telenovela Contra viento y marea. His remains rest in the Nuevo Jardín cemetery in Mexico City. He will forever be remembered as one of greatest actors in Mexican Cinema.

Selected filmography
 The Partisan of Villa (1967)

External links
 

1936 births
2005 deaths
Mexican male stage actors
Mexican male film actors
Mexican male telenovela actors
Mexican people of French descent
Mexican people of Italian descent
People from Guaymas
Male actors from Sonora